The Elizabeth Fleming Stier Award has been issued every year since 1997. It is awarded to a member of the Institute of Food Technologists (IFT) who has pursued humanitarian ideals and unselfish dedication to the well-being of the food industry, academia, students, or the general public. The award is named for Elizabeth Fleming Stier (1925-1995), a food science professor at Rutgers University in New Brunswick, New Jersey who became the first female award winner of IFT when she won the William V. Cruess Award in 1974.

Award winners receive a USD 3000 honorarium from the IFT New York Section and a plaque from IFT.

Winners

References

List of past winners - Official site

Food technology awards
Humanitarian and service awards
Awards established in 1997